La Presa Este (Spanish for "Eastern Water Dam") is the second-most largest borough of Tijuana Municipality, Baja California first being the unincorporated part of the municipality, stretching from the United States border in the north to Rosarito Beach Municipality in the south.

History
in 1835 a large amount of the Rancho Cueros de Venado owned by Juan María Marrón was placed in this Area of Tijuana.

Boroughs of Tijuana